Rites of Summer is the twelfth album by Spyro Gyra, released in 1988. At Billboard magazine, No. 104 on the Top 200 Albums chart.

Track listing 
 "Claire's Dream" (Jay Beckenstein) – 5:39
 "Daddy's Got a New Girl Now" (Beckenstein) – 4:02
 "Limelight" (Dave Samuels) – 4:27
 "Shanghai Gumbo" (Julio Fernandez) – 4:28
 "Innocent Soul" (Tom Schuman) – 4:52
 "No Man's Land" (Jeremy Wall) – 5:37
 "Yosemite" (Wall) – 5:21
 "The Archer" (Richie Morales) – 4:59
 "Captain Karma" (Schuman) – 5:40

Personnel 
Spyro Gyra
 Jay Beckenstein – saxophones, wind driven synthesizer
 Tom Schuman – keyboards
 Julio Fernández – guitars
 Oskar Cartaya – bass
 Richie Morales – drums
 Dave Samuels – vibraphone, marimba, percussion

Additional Personnel
 Steve Shapiro – synthesizer programming

Production 
 Jay Beckenstein – producer 
 Jeremy Wall – assistant producer
 Larry Swist – recording, mixing 
 Doug Rose – assistant engineer 
 Bob Ludwig – mastering at Masterdisk (New York, NY).
 Jeff Adamoff – art direction 
 Ilene Weingard – design
 Ted Glazer – front cover illustration 
 Lynn Goldsmith – back cover photography

References

1988 albums
Spyro Gyra albums
GRP Records albums